The Battle of  Seal Cove was a minor naval action west of  Lively Island, during the 1982 Falklands War. Under heavy shelling, the coaster managed to avoid capture by grounding on a nearby inlet.

Background
The ARA Monsunen was a 326 ton British coaster vessel owned by the Falklands Islands Company that had been captured in the course of the Argentine invasion. The ship was spotted by a RAF GR.3 Harrier while sailing from Fox Bay towards Stanley with a cargo of 150 drums of fuel and 250 sacks of flour. Her commander, Captain Jorge Gopcevich-Canevari  claims that his ship had evaded the vigilance of a British frigate in the same area while carrying out a similar mission on 14 May.

The engagement
At 4:00 am GMT on 23 May, a Lynx helicopter from HMS Brilliant identified Monsunen while the latter was heading to the north, west of Lively Island. After a surrender order was radioed to the motorboat, another Lynx transporting a Special Boat Service (SBS) team tried to intercept her. The aircraft was engaged by heavy machine gun and small arms fire, so it was forced to abort the mission. Corvette Lieutenant Oscar Vázquez, Gopcevich's second-in-command, later reported that while Brilliant was approaching them from the south, Yarmouth sailed ahead to Choiseul Sound, blocking the passage from the north. 

HMS Yarmouth began to fire her 4.5-inch (114 mm) guns on the Argentine vessel, forcing her to manoeuvre in order to avoid the incoming rounds.

Shortly after he succeeded in running aground his ship and ordering the crew to abandon her, the British shelling resumed. The fire was inaccurate and aimed at the general area of landing. In the process of evacuating the vessel, one of the ratings fell overboard and suffered some serious bruises, but he was successfully rescued by a young sailor. The crew members took refuge in an improvised inland shelter.

According to Vázquez, the British squadron fired 100 high-explosive and armour-piercing rounds at Monsunen in the course of the action.

The British warships eventually called off a second SBS assault on the grounded Argentine vessel as it was unclear whether troops on board "could have stay behind in ambush".

Aftermath
The British frigates gave up their chase and withdrew from the area before sunrise; Yarmouth, with the SBS detachment aboard, headed to San Carlos waters, while Brilliant joined the carrier group for refuelling. 
Monsunen  was found by her complement at dawn, with her engine still running; apparently after refloating by the rising tide. However, a sling had become entangled with her propeller, disabling the transmission.

With the ship's speed now dramatically reduced, Gopcevich radioed for help to Stanley.

A few hours later, another British coastal supply ship seized by the Argentine Navy, ARA Forrest, towed Monsunen to Darwin. The much needed cargo was uploaded by ARA Forrest, which made for Stanley. The coaster successfully completed Monsunens relief mission on 25 May. ARA Monsunen was later recovered at Darwin by British forces on 29 May, after the Battle of Goose Green.

The action is thought to be the only naval encounter between armed surface ships in the war. Jorge Gopcevich-Canevari was awarded the La Nación Argentina al Valor en Combate cross.

Gallery

Notes

References

 Mayorga, Horacio A. (1998).  No Vencidos. Ed. Planeta, Buenos Aires.  
 Freedman, Lawrence (2005). The Official History of the Falklands Campaign. Routledge. 
 Smith, Gordon (2006). Battle Atlas of the Falklands War 1982 by Land, Sea and Air.  Lulu.com. 
 Southby-Tailyour, Ewen and Clapp, Michael (1996). Amphibious Assault Falklands: The Battle of San Carlos Water.  Leo Cooper. 
 "Falkland Area Operations, 22nd-23rd May 1982"
Apostadero naval Malvinas 

1982 in the Falkland Islands
Battles and conflicts without fatalities
Battles of the Falklands War
Maritime incidents in 1982
May 1982 events in South America
Naval battles involving Argentina
Naval battles involving the United Kingdom
Naval battles post-1945